The École Nationale Supérieure d'Ingénieurs des Systèmes Avancés et Réseaux (Esisar) is an engineering school of the Grenoble Institute of Technology.

Higher Institute of Engineering in Advanced Systems and Networks 

Grenoble Institute of Technology (Grenoble Institute of Technology) INPG has 9 schools - Esisar being the most recent. Each year it confers 1000 degrees in engineering, 300 Master's degrees as well as 200 PhD theses. It has 31 research laboratories which are associated with the CNRS (the French National Scientific Research Centre).

Esisar opened its doors in 1995 to satisfy a new need expressed by many firms: to have engineers mastering all the abilities required to achieve and to put into operation advanced systems, in particular electronics, automation and industrial information technology. In fact, Advanced Systems constitute the future of the industry. They allow the more rapid creation of new products (analysis & design), manufacturing at a lower cost while ensuring good quality (regulation and a constant supervision of the processes) and they make them distinct from competing products - `smart' items and innovative functions, for example.

With this ambition in mind, Esisar was born from a unique alliance in France - Grenoble University of Technology (INPG), the leading French centre for the training of engineers and the CCI for the Drôme region.

These two partners have developed an original teaching method, giving the same value to the classic teachings of an engineering school as to the realities of the industrial world. Esisar is, for example, the only school which offers fourth year students the opportunity to complete an industrial project, carried out for a client company which defines the content. The INPG/ESISAR engineering diploma was entitled and certified by the National Commission in November 1994.

First and second years
At Esisar students are in contact with the reality of the engineering field during the first two years: electronics, automation and computer science. In the same way, early apprenticeship of industrial skills (accountancy, marketing, project management, etc.) is given to them and this continues for five years. Mathematics and physics are taught from the first to the fourth year, and are considered as basic, necessary tools for technical disciplines.

Third year 
Esisar proposes a multi-disciplinary apprenticeship, carried out with constant concern for balance. Electronics, automation, industrial computing and all industrial equipment, all benefit from generous periods of study time. For the students who join the school in the third year, their cycle starts off with six weeks of class on technical disciplines, while the students who joined in the first year are on technical training. Therefore, the different levels are harmonised.

Fourth year 
In fourth year, all student-engineers have the chance of experiencing during a six-month industrial project. This project, commissioned by a client company, is based on a feasibility study, a model or a prototype. It contributes to the creation of a product or a new function, with industrial stakes which are also imposed on the student-engineers. Organised in teams of three, supported by an appointed study supervisor, they experience a stirring time for six months. The knowledge they get is both pedagogical (a study of real meaning, a project to manage) and professional contact with technology transference. Some projects have led to products which are highly commercialised today.

Fifth year 
With the industrial project, the student-engineers have learnt how to use their many skills to carry out a project. The teaching in the 5th year is conceived in keeping with the same logic using electronics, computer science and other industrial techniques, with importance attached to synthesis, effective pooling of knowledge and the deepening of scientific understanding. After following a common programme, the student engineers choose between two "in depth" modules. The ISE module - embedded computer science, is oriented towards software aspects of advanced systems. The ISD module - command and integration of the systems and devices, is oriented towards the material aspects. Conferences led by industrialists and researchers allow students to benefit from high level coaching on the "state of the art" in their future field of activity. The year ends with a six-month industrial project.

References

External link
 Official website

Ingenieurs des systemes avances et reseaux
Grenoble Tech Esisar
Grenoble Tech Esisar
Grenoble Tech Esisar
Grenoble Tech Esisar
Grenoble Tech Esisar
Educational institutions established in 1995
1995 establishments in France